Baroness Gila von Weitershausen (born March 21, 1944) is a German actress. Born in Trebnitz (today Trzebnica), Lower Silesia, Germany (today Poland) into an aristocratic family, she has three brothers and two sisters and is the great-granddaughter of former German Chancellor Georg Graf von Hertling.

Gila von Weitershausen became popular in the late 1960s when she appeared in German comedy films, for example alongside Uschi Glas. One of the films from that period about Swinging Sixties Bavaria, gave her the nickname Engelchen ("Little Angel"), which was used by the tabloid press for decades. In one of her best-known roles, she played a prostitute in the 1971 film Murmur of the Heart. She also appeared several times as "Rowena" in the British TV series Arthur of the Britons. By common consensus one of her best performances was in Circle of Deceit (1981), a film directed by Volker Schlöndorff, where she played with Hanna Schygulla and Bruno Ganz. Von Weitershausen regularly appears in television movies to this day.

She was married to fellow actor Martin Lüttge from 1966 until 1972. Between 1970 and 1973, she had a relationship with movie director Louis Malle, who is the father of her son, Manuel Cuotemoc (born 1971). Since 1994, she has been married to Hartmut Wahle.

Selected filmography
  (1968), as Katja
 Zur Hölle mit den Paukern (1968), as Helena Taft
 The Magnificent Tony Carrera (1968), as Ursula Beaulieu
 Up the Establishment (1969), as Helene Wohlfahrt
 Charley's Uncle (1969) as "Charley" Carla Werner
 Student of the Bedroom (1970), as Nicci Krüger
 Don't Fumble, Darling (1970), as Christine
 11 Uhr 20 (1970, TV miniseries), as Maria Wassem
 Slap in the Face (1970), as Eva
 Murmur of the Heart (1971), as Freda
  (1971), as Steffi
 Bloody Friday (1972), as Marion Lotzmann
My Daughter, Your Daughter (1972), as Hella Mattes
 Arthur of the Britons (1972, TV series), as Rowena
 Cry of the Black Wolves (1972), as Frona Williams
 The Pedestrian (1973), as Karin
  (1973), as Sybille Loredo
 When Mother Went on Strike (1974), as Gloria Perkin
 Death Rite (1976), as Martine
 Schwarz und weiß wie Tage und Nächte (1978), as Marie Rosenmund
 The Unicorn (1978), as Birga Kristlein
  (1981, TV film), as Anna
 Circle of Deceit (1981), as Greta Laschen
 Blood and Honor: Youth Under Hitler (1982, TV miniseries), as Ruth Mönkmann
 The Roaring Forties (1982), as Émilie Dubisson
 The Captain's Doll (1983, TV film), as Countess Johanna zu Rassentlow
 Trenchcoat (1983), as Eva Werner
 Patrik Pacard (1984, TV miniseries), as Katrin Pacard
 Der Landarzt (1987–1995, TV series, 69 episodes), as Annemarie Mattiesen
 Die Wilsheimer (1987, TV series, 6 episodes), as Lilo Ziegler
  (1988, TV series, 11 episodes), as Gertrud Bienger
 Love and Fear (1988), as Erika
 Itinerary of a Spoiled Child (1988), as German tourist

External links
 
 Alexander Agency Munich 

1944 births
Living people
German baronesses
German film actresses
German television actresses
20th-century German actresses
21st-century German actresses
People from the Province of Lower Silesia
People from Trzebnica